Montelimar is a town in the Drôme department in France.

Montelimar may also refer to

Montelimar Beach, Nicaragua
Montelimar Airport
Montelimar, an Italian wine grape also known as Dolcetto
Montelimar nougat, a sweet
UMS Montélimar, a football team in France